Rattan  or Ratan is a 1944 Indian film, directed by M. Sadiq, produced by Abdul Rashid Kardar, and starring Swaran Lata, Karan Dewan and Amir Bano. It was the highest-grossing film of 1944.

The film is noted as the film which made Naushad one of the top music directors in the Indian film industry.

Cast
Swaranlata as Gauri
Karan Dewan as Govind
Wasti as Rattan, Gangu's brother 
Badri Prasad as Govind's father
Manju as Manju, Rattan's sister
Gulab as Govind's mother
Rajkumari Shukla 
Auzurie as Gangu
Chandabai as the Bhabhi
Amirbano as Gauri's mother

Music
The film had music by Naushad, with lyrics by the popular poet of the 1940s, D. N. Madhok.

 "Akkhiyan Mila Ke Jiya Bharma Ke, Chale Nahin Jana" - Zohrabai Ambalawali
 "Rum Jhum Barse Baadarwa, Mast Hawain Aaein, Piya Ghar Aaja" - Zohrabai Ambalawali
 "Milke Bichhad Gayii Akkhiyan" - Amirbai Karnataki
 "Jab Tum Hi Chale Pardes Laga Kar Theiss" - Karan Dewan
 "O janewale Balamwa" - Amirbai Karnataki and Shyam Kumar
 "Pardesi Balma Baadal Aaya" - Zohrabai Ambalewali
 "Aai Diwali Aai Diwali" - Zohrabai Ambalewali
 "Angdai Teri Hai Bahana" - Manju
 "Jhoothe Hain Sab Sapne Suhane" - Manju
 "Sawan Ke Baadalo Unn Se Yeh Jaa Kaho" - Zohrabai Ambalewali and Karan Dewan

References

External links
 

1944 films
1940s Hindi-language films
Films scored by Naushad
1940s Urdu-language films
Indian romantic musical films
1940s romantic musical films
Films directed by M. Sadiq
Urdu-language Indian films